Bronx River Houses is a low-income public housing project in the Soundview section of the Bronx, New York City. It consists of nine buildings with 1,260 apartments. Completed February 28, 1951, the  Bronx development is bordered by East 174th Street, Harrod, and Bronx River Avenues. Bronx River Houses is home to 3,025 residents. The project is patrolled by P.S.A. 8 located at 2794 Randall Avenue in the Throgs Neck section of the Bronx.

Bronx River Addition comprises two senior-only buildings, 6 and 12 stories tall with 225 apartments. Completed February 28, 1966, the  Bronx development is bordered by East 172nd and East 174th Streets and Manor and Harrod Avenues. Bronx River Addition is home to 234 residents.

History
Bronx River Houses was built to provide temporary housing to working-class families. After a few years, crime and urban decay began to plague the development as more generationally poor families moved in. This eventually had an effect on the surrounding community and led to white flight and abandonment. Violent crime remains a serious problem in the Bronx River Houses and the surrounding community.

Until the late 1990s, the Bronx River Houses served as the worldwide ground zero for Hip-Hop culture. In the mid-1990s, the Giuliani administration used the NYPD to drive the drug gangs out of the houses. The Bronx River Houses were the first housing projects in the country to be put under 24-hour police watch and have their common areas redesigned so that the entire housing project would be watched by cameras. Famous Hip-Hop musicians from the Bronx River Houses include Afrika Bambaataa, DJ Jazzy Jay, Martin Cofield, Sean Perry, Afrika Islam, Jamall Moss, the Soul Sonic Force, Kylik Clark "Alleymatill", Edwin Brown Jr (RIP aka Duardo aka Neph aka Special Ed... Brodie 4 Ever...), Fernando "Royal" Singleton, Eshawn Hall (DJ Mista Smoke) and Kareem Kennedo (NY$) Kill Bill Gang. DJ Red Alert also got his start in the Bronx River Houses.

Demographics
Tenants are mostly African American, Dominican and Puerto Rican although there are also Asian, Mexican and Ecuadorian tenants.

Notable residents 
Afrika Bambaataa (1957–), disc jockey, rapper, songwriter and producer.
Judy Craig (1946–), lead singer of the doo-whop group The Chiffons, James Monroe High School graduate.
Darren Carrington, NFL football player.
Daryl Brown, Actor.

See also
New York City Housing Authority
List of New York City Housing Authority properties

References

External links
 http://www1.nyc.gov/assets/nycha/downloads/pdf/Bronx%20River%20and%20Bronx%20River%20Addition.pdf

Public housing in the Bronx
Residential buildings completed in 1951
Residential buildings in the Bronx
Soundview, Bronx